Niklas Bäckström (born August 22, 1989) is a Swedish mixed martial arts fighter who competes in the Lightweight and Featherweight divisions. He has previously competed in the Ultimate Fighting Championship.

Biography 
Bäckström began training Jujutsu at the age of 10. At 14 he also began Boxing and Wrestling in his hometown Luleå. After high school he moved to Stockholm and took up Mixed martial arts.

Mixed martial arts career

Early career 

Bäckström started his martial arts career as a competitor in Submission wrestling and Brazilian Jiu-Jitsu. He was awarded his BJJ purple belt after winning a Swedish tournament in 2008, he also competed in Shootfighting with a record of 2-0, before starting his professional MMA career in 2009.

After staying undefeated following his first three professional bouts, Bäckström signed with the British promotion Cage Warriors. He made his promotional debut against Adam Edwards, on April 24, 2011 at CWFC 41, he won the fight by unanimous decision.
He was later expected to face top Irish prospect and future UFC fighter Conor McGregor on September 8, 2011, at CWFC: Fight Night 2. However, Bäckström was forced out of the bout with a broken hand, and was replaced by Aron Jahnsen.

Bäckström then continued to fight on the European circuit and by 2014 he had racked up a record of 7-0 1 NC, with 4 victories by TKO and 1 by submission, including a unanimous decision win over Sergej Grecicho and a 15-second TKO over Max Coga, before getting the call from the UFC.

Ultimate Fighting Championship 

On May 15, 2014, it was revealed that Bäckström had signed a contract with the UFC.

He made his debut on short notice, replacing an injured Thiago Tavares against Tom Niinimäki on May 31, 2014 at UFC Fight Night 41. Despite coming in as a slight underdog, Bäckström won the fight by submission in the first round. He was also awarded a Performance of the Night bonus for his efforts.

Bäckström faced Mike Wilkinson on October 4, 2014 at UFC Fight Night 53. He lost the fight via knockout in the first round.

Bäckström faced Noad Lahat on June 20, 2015 at UFC Fight Night 69 He lost the back and forth fight by majority decision (28-28, 28-29, 28-29). However, on the MMA media scorecards, most had scored the fight a draw, with Bäckström winning round one and three 10-9 and losing round two 10-8, making the score 28-28.

In late August, 2015 it was announced, surprisingly to some, that Bäckström had been released from the promotion.

Post-UFC; Independent promotions 
In his first fight since his UFC stint, Bäckström fought Bulgarian veteran Georgi Stoyanov on November 28, 2015 in the headliner at the Battle of Botnia 2015-event, close to his hometown in North Sweden. He won the fight by submission due to a rear-naked choke in the first round.

Since his BAMMA-debut was postponed (see below), Bäckström instead took a short notice fight against Danijel Kokora on June 4, 2016 at Scandinavian Fight Nights 1. The bout was contested at lightweight, with Bäckström moving up and Kokora moving down in weight. He won the fight by submission due to a rear-naked choke in the first round.

Bäckström faced Joni Salovaara on November 26, 2016 in the headliner at Cage 37. Despite suffering a broken hand, he won the fight by unanimous decision.

He was then set to face Tim Wilde on June 14, 2017 in the main event at Tanko FC 5. The fight would get scrapped from the card a little more than a week before the event, due to Wilde having issues making the weight.

BAMMA 
On April 11, 2016 it was revealed that Bäckström had signed with British promotion BAMMA. He was expected to make his promotional debut on June 4, 2016 at BAMMA 26. No opponent was announced. He was later set to face Attila Korkmaz at the same event which had been postponed to September 10, 2016. However, the matchup was later scrapped from the card altogether. Following the postponing of his first two bookings, he instead fought for other promotions during that timeframe (see above).

Bäckströms promotional debut was then set to be against Brian Moore on December 16, 2016 at BAMMA 27 which was a card co-promoted by BAMMA and Bellator. It was later revealed that Bäckström instead would be facing Ronnie Mann, and it would be a fight for the BAMMA featherweight title. However, Bäckström had to pull out of the fight due to an injury. The injury was a broken hand that he suffered in a fight which he took after his previously booked fight in BAMMA had been canceled. He was replaced by Martin Stapleton.

Absolute Championship Berkut 
Bäckström was first expected to face Thiago Tavares on July 22, 2017 at ACB 65. However, Tavares was forced to withdraw from the bout due to an injury and was replaced by Andrew Fisher. He lost the fight by unanimous decision.

Konfrontacja Sztuk Walki 
Bäckström made his return from 4.5 year lay off against Sebastian Rajewski on January 15, 2022 at KSW 66. He lost the bout via unanimous decision.

Championships and accomplishments

Mixed Martial Arts 
 Ultimate Fighting Championship
 Performance of the Night (One time) vs. Tom Niinimäki
 Nordic MMA Awards – MMAViking.com
 2014 Submission of the Year vs. Tom Niinimäki (UFC Fight Night 41)

Submission Grapling 
 2008 Västerås Cup 4 Open Weight BJJ Tournament 3rd place
 2010 Swedish National Submission Wrestling Lightweight Tournament 3rd place
 2012 Swedish National Submission Wrestling Lightweight Tournament 1st place

Mixed martial arts record 

|-
| Loss
| align=center | 11-4 (1)
| Sebastian Rajewski
| Decision (unanimous)
| KSW 66: Ziółkowski vs. Mańkowski
| 
| align=center | 3
| align=center | 5:00
| Szczecin, Poland
| 
|-
| Loss
| align=center | 11-3 (1)
| Andrew Fisher
| Decision (unanimous)
| ACB 65: Silva vs. Agnaev
| 
| align=center | 3
| align=center | 5:00
| Sheffield, England
|
|-
| Win
| align=center | 11–2 (1)
| Joni Salovaara
| Decision (unanimous)
| Cage 37: Bäckström vs. Salovaara
| 
| align=center | 3
| align=center | 5:00
| Helsinki, Finland
|
|-
| Win
| align=center | 10–2 (1)
| Danijel Kokora
| Submission (rear-naked choke)
| Scandinavian Fight Nights 1
| 
| align=center | 1
| align=center | N/A
| Solna, Sweden
| Lightweight bout.
|-
| Win
| align=center | 9–2 (1)
| Georgi Stoyanov
| Submission (rear-naked choke)
| Battle of Botnia 2015
| 
| align=center | 1
| align=center | 4:15
| Umeå, Sweden
|
|-
| Loss
| align=center | 8–2 (1)
| Noad Lahat
| Decision (majority)
| UFC Fight Night: Jedrzejczyk vs. Penne
| 
| align=center | 3
| align=center | 5:00
| Berlin, Germany
|
|-
| Loss
| align=center | 8–1 (1)
| Mike Wilkinson
| KO (punches)
| UFC Fight Night: Nelson vs. Story
| 
| align=center | 1
| align=center | 1:19
| Stockholm, Sweden
|
|-
| Win
| align=center | 8–0 (1)
| Tom Niinimaki
| Submission (bulldog choke)
| UFC Fight Night: Munoz vs. Mousasi
| 
| align=center | 1
| align=center | 4:15
| Berlin, Germany
| 
|-
| Win
| align=center | 7–0 (1)
| Max Coga
| TKO (front kick and punches)
| Europa MMA: Coga vs. Bäckström
| 
| align=center | 1
| align=center | 0:15
| Brentwood, England
|
|-
| Win
| align=center | 6–0 (1)
| Jaakko Vayrynen
| TKO (knee and punches)
| Lappeenranta Fight Night 9
| 
| align=center | 2
| align=center | 0:58
| Kuopio, Finland
|
|-
| Win
| align=center | 5–0 (1)
| Thomas Hytten
| TKO (punches)
| Vision FC Fight Night 1
| 
| align=center | 2
| align=center | N/A
| Karlstad, Sweden
|
|-
| Win
| align=center | 4–0 (1)
| Sergej Grecicho
| Decision (unanimous)
| Botnia Punishment 11
| 
| align=center | 3
| align=center | 5:00
| Seinäjoki, Finland
|
|-
| Win
| align=center | 3–0 (1)
| Adam Edwards
| Decision (unanimous)
| Cage Warriors: 41
| 
| align=center | 3
| align=center | 5:00
| London, England
|
|-
| NC
| align=center | 2–0 (1)
| Elias Kunnas
| No Contest
| Artic Fight 3
| 
| align=center | 1
| align=center | N/A
| Rovaniemi, Finland
| 
|-
| Win
| align=center | 2–0
| Simon Sköld
| TKO (punches)
| Superior Challenge 6
| 
| align=center | 3
| align=center | 3:23
| Stockholm, Sweden
|
|-
| Win
| align=center | 1–0
| Gabriel Mboge Nesje
| Submission (rear-naked choke)
| Superior Challenge 4
| 
| align=center | 1
| align=center | 2:30
| Stockholm, Sweden
|

Amateur mixed martial arts record 

|-
| Win
| align=center | 2–0
| Jonas Forssell
| Submission (rear-naked choke)
| Swedish Shootfighting League 07: Umeå Martial Arts Festival
| 
| align=center | 2
| align=center | 1:21
| Umeå, Sweden
|
|-
| Win
| align=center | 1–0
| Victor Garabedian
| Submission (rear-naked choke)
| Swedish Shootfighting League 07: Shoot Challenge 2
| 
| align=center | 1
| align=center | 1:23
| Stockholm, Sweden
|

See also 
 List of current UFC fighters
 List of male mixed martial artists

References

External links 
 
 Official UFC profile

1989 births
Featherweight mixed martial artists
Mixed martial artists utilizing boxing
Mixed martial artists utilizing wrestling
Mixed martial artists utilizing Brazilian jiu-jitsu
Living people
Sportspeople from Stockholm
Swedish male mixed martial artists
Swedish practitioners of Brazilian jiu-jitsu
Swedish submission wrestlers
Ultimate Fighting Championship male fighters